Arzach is a comic book collection of four wordless short stories by artist/author Jean 'Moebius' Giraud, which were originally published in the French sci-fi/fantasy comics magazine Métal Hurlant. The stories follow Arzach, a silent warrior who rides a pterodactyl-like creature through a strange, desolate landscape. The imagery and situations in Arzach are often compared to dreams or the subconscious. These stories had an enormous impact on the French comics industry, and the Arzach character is still among Moebius' most famous creations. It can be defined as a pantomime comic, fantasy comics or an experimental comic.

The spelling of the title, originally Arzach, was changed in each of the original short stories.

Moebius later revisited the character with a story called The Legend of Arzach. This later story contains dialogue, and it ties the Arzach stories into a previously unrelated Moebius story called The Detour.

Moebius' 2010 book Arzak: L'Arpenteur (Arzak: The Surveyor) was the first of a planned trilogy to explore the origin of the character. However, with the death of Jean Giraud in March 2012, this vision was never realised.

Legacy
Arzach is credited as the inspiration for the final sequence, "Taarna", of the animated film Heavy Metal (1981).

Moebius' Arzach is a novel by Jean-Marc and Randy Lofficier, published by iBOOKS in August 2000. The book features a cover and inside illustrations by Moebius, and a map by J.O. Ladronn. The first half of the book is a novelisation of several Arzach stories. The second half recursively introduces John Gerard (a thinly disguised Jean Giraud) and family into the world of Arzach. A brief essay on the publishing history of Arzach concludes the book.

Arzach was one of Panzer Dragoon's major artistic influences. Jean Giraud even contributed in the creative process of Team Andromeda's game with original artwork.

Arzach inspired Hayao Miyazaki and he said in an interview the he directed Nausicaä of the Valley of the Wind under Moebius' influence.

See also
 Arzak Rhapsody (2003 Film), IMDB
 In 2006, Arzach was planned as Japanese film, but only a trailer was finished

External links
 Legends of Arzach
 Comic Vine
 Official Arzak Rhapsody website

Sources

References
 Arzak_Rhapsody film, DVD Anime

French comic strips
1975 comics debuts
Comics characters introduced in 1975
2010 comics endings
Fantasy comics
Fantasy graphic novels
Male characters in comics
Pantomime comics
Comics by Jean Giraud
Comics adapted into novels
Comics adapted into animated series
Comics adapted into television series